The 2011 FINA Diving World Series – Moscow Leg is the first of the four legs of the 2011 FINA Diving World Series. It was held from March 18–19, 2011.

Eight gold medals were contested at this competition namely, both men's and women's 3 metre springboard and 10 metre platform, and men's and women's synchronized 3 metre springboard and 10 metre platform.

Participating countries 
The number beside each nation represents the number of athletes who competed for each country at this leg of 2011 FINA Diving World Series.

 (2)
 (4)
 (8)
 (2)
 (3)
 (6)
 (2)
 (2)
 (7)
 (10)
 (1)
 (2)
 (4)

Medals table

Medal summary

Men

Women

Results

Men's 3 m Springboard
Green denotes finalists

Men's 10 m Platform
Green denotes finalists

References

Moscow
2011 in Russian sport
International aquatics competitions hosted by Russia
Diving competitions in Russia
Sports competitions in Moscow